The men's 200 metres event at the 1967 Pan American Games was held in Winnipeg on 1 and 2 August.

Medalists

Results

Heats
Held on 1 August

Wind:Heat 1: +5.6 m/s, Heat 2: +3.9 m/s, Heat 3: +5.1 m/s, Heat 4: +5.9 m/s

Semifinals
Held on 1 August

Wind:Heat 1: +4.2 m/s, Heat 2: +4.0 m/s

Final
Held on 2 August

References

Athletics at the 1967 Pan American Games
1967